Volkovo may refer to:
North Macedonia
Volkovo, Gjorče Petrov
Volkovo, Prilep

Russia
Volkovo, Russia, several rural localities in Russia
Volkovo Cemetery, the largest and oldest non-Orthodox cemetery in St. Petersburg, Russia

See also 
 Volkov (disambiguation)
 Volkovsky (disambiguation)